is the Japanese designer who created Hello Kitty.

She was born in Japan. After graduating from Musashino Art University, she joined Sanrio. She designed the first original Sanrio character, Coro Chan, a bear which was introduced in 1973. In 1974 she made the original design for Hello Kitty, Sanrio's most successful and best known character. She left Sanrio in 1976 to get married and has been working as a freelance designer ever since. She did not make a lot of money from Hello Kitty.

The other characters she has created include Angel Cat Sugar and Rebecca Bonbon. She has also published some picture books.

References

External links

The Official Hello Kitty Website
The Official Rebecca Bonbon Website
The Official Angel Cat Sugar Website

1946 births
Living people
Hello Kitty
Artists from Chiba Prefecture
Japanese designers